Romuald Hazoumè (born 1962 in Porto Novo) is a Yoruba artist from the Republic of Bénin, best known for his work La Bouche du Roi, a reworking of the 1789 image of the slave ship Brookes. La Bouche du Roi was widely exhibited in the United Kingdom as part of the centenary remembrance of the Slave Trade Act 1807 by Parliament. He only uses recycled materials to create his works.

Hazoumè is also known for his mask series, which he started in the mid-1980s. These masks, made from discarded gasoline canisters, resemble those used in traditional African culture and ceremonies. In explaining these works, Hazoumè has said: “I send back to the West that which belongs to them, that is to say, the refuse of consumer society that invades us every day.”
 
Hazoumè is among the artists represented in The Contemporary African Art Collection (CAAC) of Jean Pigozzi.

Selected exhibitions

Solo
2012 Cargoland - October Gallery, London
2011 Romuald Hazoumè
2010 Romuald Hazoumè: My Paradise - Made in Porto Novo, Gerisch-Stiftung, Neumünster, Germany
2009 Romuald Hazoumè: Made in Porto-Novo, October Gallery, London
2009 Exit Ball, Aliceday, Brussels, Belgium
2008 La Bouche du Roi, Horniman Museum & Gardens, London
2007 La Bouche du Roi: An artwork by Romuald Hazoumè, The British Museum, London, England
2006 La Bouche du Roi, Musée du quai Branly, Paris, France
2005 Romuald Hazoumè Installation Art, CAISA (City of Helsinki Cultural Office), Helsinki, Finland
2005 ARTicle 14 - débrouilles-toi, toi-même, October Gallery, London
2001 Romuald HazoumèGalerie Olivier Houg, Lyon
1998 Romuald Hazoumè, Art Gallery of New South Wales, Sydney, Australia
1997 Romuald Hazoumè, Galerie 20, Arnhem

Group
2010/2011 The Land Between Us, Whitworth Art Gallery, Manchester, UK
2010/2011 The Global Africa Project, MAD – Museum of Arts and Design, New York
2010/2011 21st Century: Art in the First Decade, Queensland Art Gallery, Brisbane, Australia
2010 African Stories, Marrakech Art Fair, Marrakech
2009 Against Exclusion, 3rd biennale of Contemporary Art, The Garage Center for Contemporary Culture, Moscow, Russia
2008 Angaza Afrika - African Art Now, October Gallery, London
2008 PetrodollART, Galerie Motte et Rouard, Paris, France
2007/2008 Why Africa?, Pinacoteca Giovanni e Marella Agnelli, Turin, Italy
2007 UN/FAIR TRADE, Die Kunst der Gerechtigkeit, Neue Galerie Graz am Landesmuseum Joanneum, Graz, Austria
2007 From Courage to Freedom - El Anatsui / Romuald Hazoumè / Owusu-Ankomah, October Gallery, London
2004-2007 Africa Remix, Dusseldorf; Hayward Gallery, London; Centre pompidou, Paris; Mori Art Museum, Tokyo; Moderna Museet, Stockholm, Johannesburg Art Gallery, Johannesburg, South Africa
1999 Spaceship Earth, Art in General, New York
1999 Paradise 8, Exit Art, New York
1999 Liverpool Biennial: International Festival of Contemporary Art, Liverpool, UK
1992 Out of Africa: Contemporary African Artists from the Pigozzi Collection, Saatchi, Gallery, London

Awards and prizes
 2009 3rd Biennale of Contemporary Art, Moscow
 2007 Arnold-Bode-Preis, documenta 12, Kassel
 1996 George-Maciunas-Preis, Wiesbaden

References

Further reading
Andre Magnin and Jacques Soulilou (eds.), Contemporary Art of Africa'', New York: Harry N. Abrams Inc, 1996.

External links
 "Romuald Hazoumè (Benin)", October Gallery website.

1967 births
Living people
Beninese artists
People from Porto-Novo
Yoruba artists